Marquess of Ailsa, of the Isle of Ailsa in the County of Ayr, is a title in the Peerage of the United Kingdom. It was created on 10 September 1831 for Archibald Kennedy, 12th Earl of Cassilis. The title Earl of Cassilis (pronounced "Cassels") had been created in 1509 for the 3rd Lord Kennedy. This title had been created in the Peerage of Scotland in 1457. The 1st Marquess had been created Baron Ailsa in the Peerage of the United Kingdom on 12 November 1806.

The name of the title was taken from the Island of Ailsa Craig in the Firth of Clyde. 

James Kennedy, Archbishop of St Andrews, was the younger brother of the first Lord Kennedy.

The Marquess of Ailsa is the hereditary Clan Chief of Clan Kennedy.

The family's seats were Cassillis House and Culzean Castle, near Maybole, Ayrshire.

Lords Kennedy (1457)
 Gilbert Kennedy, 1st Lord Kennedy (–)
 John Kennedy, 2nd Lord Kennedy (died 1508)
 David Kennedy, 3rd Lord Kennedy (died 1513) (created Earl of Cassilis in 1509)

Earls of Cassilis (1509)
 David Kennedy, 1st Earl of Cassilis (1463–1513)
 Gilbert Kennedy, 2nd Earl of Cassilis (died 1527)
 Gilbert Kennedy, 3rd Earl of Cassilis (1515–1558)
 Gilbert Kennedy, 4th Earl of Cassilis (c. 1541–1576)
 John Kennedy, 5th Earl of Cassilis (c. 1573–1615)
 John Kennedy, 6th Earl of Cassilis (died 1668)
 John Kennedy, 7th Earl of Cassilis (1653–1701)
 John Kennedy, 8th Earl of Cassilis (1700–1759)

"From 1759 to 1762 the titles and estates were in dispute between the heir male and the heir general. The latter, William [Douglas], Earl of Ruglen and March later Duke of Queensberry, was son and heir of William [Douglas], Earl of March, by his wife Anne [Hamilton], suo jure Countess of Ruglen, 1st dau. and heir of line of John [Hamilton], Earl of Selkirk and Ruglen, by his first wife Lady Anne Kennedy, the only daughter that had issue of John [Kennedy], 7th Earl of Cassillis. He claimed the estates under an entail of 5 September 1698, which he contended could not be set aside by the entail of 1759. The entail of 1759 was however upheld, though by a narrow majority, in the Court of Session, and confirmed, on appeal, by the House of Lords. He then, under the designation of "William, Earl of Cassillis, Ruglen and March" claimed "the titles and honours of Earl of Cassillis and Lord Kennedy," on the ground of certain charters of 24 April 1641 and 29 September 1642. Sir Thomas Kennedy, Bart., claimed the said titles as heir male, and the two petitions having been laid before the House of Lords, it was adjudged, 27 January 1762, that the latter had a right "to the honour and dignity of Earl of Cassillis as heir male of the body of David, the 1st Earl of Cassillis, and [to that] of Lord Kennedy as heir male of the body of Gilbert, the 1st Lord Kennedy.""

 Thomas Kennedy, 9th Earl of Cassilis (died 1775), previously the 4th Baronet of Culzean
 David Kennedy, 10th Earl of Cassilis (died 1792)
 Archibald Kennedy, 11th Earl of Cassilis (died 1794)
 Archibald Kennedy, 12th Earl of Cassilis (1770–1846) (created Baron Ailsa in 1806 and Marquess of Ailsa in 1831)

Marquesses of Ailsa (1831)
 Archibald Kennedy, 1st Marquess of Ailsa (1770–1846)
 Archibald Kennedy, 2nd Marquess of Ailsa (1816–1870)
 Archibald Kennedy, 3rd Marquess of Ailsa (1847–1938)
 Archibald Kennedy, 4th Marquess of Ailsa (1872–1943)
 Charles Kennedy, 5th Marquess of Ailsa (1875–1956)
 Angus Kennedy, 6th Marquess of Ailsa (1882–1957)
 Archibald David Kennedy, 7th Marquess of Ailsa (1925–1994)
 Archibald Angus Charles Kennedy, 8th Marquess of Ailsa (1956–2015)
 David Thomas Kennedy, 9th Marquess of Ailsa (born 1958)

Present peer
David Thomas Kennedy, 9th Marquess of Ailsa (born 3 July 1958) is the younger son of the 7th Marquess and his wife Mary Burn, daughter of John Burn, a railwayman at Amble, Northumberland.

He was educated at Strathallan School, Perthshire, and Berkshire Agricultural College, Maidenhead.

In 1991 Kennedy married Anne Kelly, daughter of Bernard Kelly, and they have two children:
Lady Katherine Jean Kennedy (born 1993)
Archibald David Kennedy, Earl of Cassilis (born 1995), heir apparent

In 1999 Kennedy was living at Morriston, Culzean, Maybole, Ayrshire.

On 16 January 2015 he succeeded his older brother as Marquess of Ailsa (1831), Earl of Cassillis (1509), Baron Ailsa (1806), and Lord Kennedy in the peerage of Scotland (1458).

Individuals from (1) to (4) are in remainder to the marquessate of Ailsa and the earldom of Cassilis, while individuals (5) and (6) are only in remainder to the earldom.

 Archibald Kennedy, 11th Earl of Cassilis (1720–1794)
 Archibald Kennedy, 1st Marquess of Ailsa (1770–1846)
Archibald Kennedy, Earl of Cassilis (1794–1832)
 Archibald Kennedy, 2nd Marquess of Ailsa (1816–1870)
 Archibald Kennedy, 3rd Marquess of Ailsa (1847–1938)
 Angus Kennedy, 6th Marquess of Ailsa (1882–1957)
 Archibald Kennedy, 7th Marquess of Ailsa (1925–1994)
 David Kennedy, 9th Marquess of Ailsa (b. 1958)
(1). Archibald David Kennedy, Earl of Cassilis (b. 1995)
Lord Gilbert Kennedy (1822–1901)
John Gilbert Kennedy (1854–1923)
Nigel Augustus Kennedy (1886–1957)
(2). Ian Michael Godfrey Kennedy (b. 1921)
(3). Angus Michael David Kennedy (b. 1962)
(4). Louis Michael James Kennedy (b. 1998)
Hon. Robert Kennedy (1773–1843)
John Kennedy (d. 1845)
Edward Briggs Kennedy (1842–1914)
Edward Coverley Kennedy (1879–1939)
Ludovic Kennedy (1919–2009) 
(5). Alastair Charles Coverley Kennedy (b. 1963)
(6). Sean Tinnaphop Kennedy (b. 1998)

References

Sources
 
 

 
 The Rulers of Strathspey, a history of the lairds of Grant and the Earls of Seafield, 1911, by the Earl of Cassilis

Marquessates in the Peerage of the United Kingdom
Noble titles created in 1831
Marquess